Purification of water  may refer to any of the following.

Water purification, the large scale production of clean water for supply to consumer taps and industry.
Distilled water, the use of distillation to remove contaminants from water
Portable water purification, techniques for use in emergencies or away from  conventional sources of clean water
Water filter, devices used for small scale quality improvement, often in domestic situations
Deionized water, industrial production of ultra pure water
Reverse osmosis, a technique for producing potable water from highly contaminated sources.
Sewage treatment, treatment of sewage to remove contaminants